A Thousand Kisses Deep may refer to:

 "A Thousand Kisses Deep", a song on Leonard Cohen's 2001 album Ten New Songs
 A Thousand Kisses Deep (album), a 2003 album by Chris Botti (which also includes an eponymous track)
 A Thousand Kisses Deep (film), a 2011 English film